Fuyun County as the official romanized name, also transliterated from Uyghur as Koktokay County, is a county situated in the Xinjiang Uyghur Autonomous Region and is under the administration of the Altay Prefecture. It has an area of 32,237 km² with a population of 80,000. The seat of Fuyun County is in Ku Ertix Town (库额尔齐斯镇). The Koktokay National Geopark is in Koktokay Town (可可托海镇). The Postcode of Fuyun County is 836100. The county is served by Fuyun Koktokay Airport.

Administrative divisions 
Town (镇 / بازارلىق‎ / قالاشىع‎)
Ku'ertix Town (库额尔齐斯镇 / قۇئېرتىش بازىرى / قۋەرتىس قالاشىعى), Koktokay Town (可可托海镇 / كوكتوقاي بازىرى / كوكتوعاي قالاشىعى ), Shakurti Town (恰库尔图镇 / چاقۇرت بازىرى / شاكۇرتى قالاشىعى), Dure Town (杜热镇 / دۇرە بازىرى  / دۇرە قالاشىعى ), Karatüngke Town (喀拉通克镇 / قارا تۇڭكې بازىرى / قارا توڭكە قالاشىعى)
	
Township (乡 / يېزا / اۋىل)
Turgun Township (吐尔洪乡 / تۇرغۇن يېزىسى / تۇرعىن اۋىلى), Kürti Township (库尔特乡 / كۇرتى يېزىسى  / كۇرتى اۋىلى ), Temeki Township (铁买克乡 / تېمېكى يېزىسى / تەمەكى اۋىلى), Kara Bulgin Township (喀拉布勒根乡 / قارا بۇلغىن يېزىسى / قارا بۇلعىن اۋىلى), Kizilshilik (克孜勒希力克乡 / قىزىلشىلىك يېزىسى / قىزىلشىلىك اۋىلى)

Demographics

Geography

See also
 Ospan Batyr

References

County-level divisions of Xinjiang
Altay Prefecture